The Germany men's national under-18 and under-19 basketball team is the basketball side that represents Germany in international under-18 and under-19 competitions. It is administered by the German Basketball Federation (Deutscher Basketball Bund).

Out of all teams, Germany has the most FIBA U18 European Championship Division A appearances without ever winning a medal. Their best finish to date was the 4th places in 1986 and 2016.

FIBA U18 European Championship participations

FIBA Under-19 Basketball World Cup participations

See also
 Germany men's national basketball team
 Germany men's national under-17 basketball team
 Germany women's national under-19 basketball team

References

External links
 Official website 
 Archived records of Germany team participations

U
Basketball
Men's national under-18 basketball teams
Men's national under-19 basketball teams